Rajauli is a tehsil, block and subdivision (sub–district) in Nawada district of Magadh division of the Indian state of Bihar. Rajauli, a Scheduled Caste (SC) reserved Assembly Constituency (AC) seat, had a total of 302900 electors during the 2015 Bihar Legislative Assembly election. Rajauli subdivision consists of 95 panchayats and 688 revenue villages while Rajauli block consists of 17 panchayats and 169 revenue villages.

The hills in Rajauli's neighbourhood have religious significance for Hindus and many legends are attached to them. Rishis such as Shringi, Durvasa, Gautama and Lomasa have their ashrams on eponymously named peaks here. Veer Lorik, the Ahir cowherd hero, is said to have been born in the area and was the reason for the bountiful cultivation in and around Rajauli at one time. Rajauli has a Sikh connection including a visit by Guru Nanak. The Gurudwara Rajauli Sangat, one of the largest sangats in the state, is in Rajauli and is part of Bihar Tourism's "Guru Circuit".

History 
Francis Buchanan-Hamilton passed through Rajauli during his surveys of Patna and Gaya in 1811–1812. He kept a journal in which he wrote on 14 December 1811, "[…] the town of Rajauli situated among fine mango groves. These were all planted by a Fakir, a most venerable personage, by whom I was visited on my arrival. He is a Saiud born at Baragong near Mirzapur, and after some adventures in the west came and sat down here in the midst of wild beasts and the devils worshipped by the Infidels. After a residence of 25 years he attracted the notice of Kamgar Khan, from who he obtained a considerable grant of lands, which he has brought into cultivation and ornamented with fine plantations."

An Archaeological Survey of India report by J D Beglar in 1872–73 mentions that the hills of Rajauli "are in their way deserving of mention", as they are said to have been home to the Saptarishis. The peaks here are named after a number of saints. Singar Peak, named after Sringi Rishi, is ascended by devotees while at the base an annual fair takes place. The 1873 survey report also mentioned an annual fair at Ektara, Mahabar hill, Satgaon — "Ektâra is a small place of pilgrimage situated in the wild Rajauli Hills at the source of the Dhanarjeh river which flows past Rajauli; here is a very picturesque waterfall and a small rock cell; not far from here I see "rock temples" marked in the Indian Atlas sheet, but my enquiries for them were vain." Other rishis including Durvasa, Lomasa and Gautama lived in Rajaulis neighbourhood; with their ashrams also housing Goddess Durga and Goddess Indra, the later to whom villagers use to pray during times of drought. Dubaur, 15 kilometers south of Rajauli, claims to be the birthplace of Goala (Ahir) Veer Lorik. Lorik is said to have been the force behind Rajauli's transformation into a cultivated plain. Buchanan wrote that Dubaur is "a village of Bhunghiyas belonging to Brijomohun Saha, a Ghatwal".

By 1875, Bihar to Rajauli was a metaled road, a rarity in the region at the time. In 1901, the population of Rajauli village was 1509. It was connected to Nawada, 18 km to the north, by a metaled road. Rajauli was an important market for the neighbouring hills.

In 1906 L.S.S. O'malley of the Indian Civil Service wrote that Rajauli, "possesses and excellent system of drainage, which dates back to the time it was a municipality. The drains are of cement, but since the abolition of the municipality they have been neglected and have become silted up. Rajauli contains a police-station, a branch establishment of the Nanakpanthi monastery at Akbarpur (8 miles to the north), and a Muhammadan charitable endowment, in which there is a sacred fire said to have been lit 300 years ago by fire brought from Mecca."

Rajauli's neighbourhood also had granite and mica mines which were described by explorers and surveyors. In 1838, Robert Montgomery Martin described these in detail after a visit, also mentioning the presence of "felspar" (however most of these locations are now in Jharkhand).

Sikh connection and Gurdwara Rajauli Sangat 
A large fort-like building in the center of the town is called 'sangat', meaning "a body of men and women who meet religiously specially in presence of the 'Guru Granth Sahib'". It is one of the largest sangats in Bihar. The Directorate of Tourism of the Government of Bihar places Gurdwara Rajauli Sangat in its official "Guru Circuit":

Francis Buchanan-Hamilton wrote in 1811 that Rajauli "has a Sanget of the followers of Nanak, a large neat–looking place with a tiled roof".

Guru Nanak is said to have stopped at Rajauli. In Dr Trilochan Singh's biography of Guru Nanak he writes, "Rajauli bears witness to the fact that the Buddhist sages of this area accepted the teachings of Guru Nanak and established permanent centres of Guru Nanak’s school of thought in this region".

A fair during Guru Nanak Gurpurab takes place here. There is a Khankah at some distance from the Sangat.

Geography
Rajauli is situated along the Dhanarjay river on NH 20 (previously numbered as NH31). Rajauli is a sub-division that borders the state of Jharkhand, and has an elevation of 135 m above sea level. Rajauli is mainly surrounded by small and mid-range mountains including Lomash Rishi and Shringi Rishi mountains. More than 100 villages make up Rajauli subdistrict. Rajauli was once home to monsoon and prairie forest. The principal trees were sakhua, paisar, khair, Shisham, parmi, salaiya simar, kendu and peepal. The forest and wild life have almost completely disappeared. Gautam Budha Wildlife Sanctuary is nearby.

Demographics 
In 1901, the population of Rajauli village was 1509. By 1951, the population was 12,673. According to the 2011 census of India, Rajauli sub–district had a population of 1,66,226 with 24444 households.

Administrative divisions 
In December 2008, Bihar Chief Minister Nitish Kumar announced that Rajauli would be made into a Nagar Panchayat. For over a decade the matter of converting Rajauli into a Nagar Panchayat had been pending; even after government approval, delimitation problems caused delays. News reports emerged of Rajauli being upgraded into a Nagar Panchayat in December 2020, however administratively the implementation will take a couple of months.

Rajauli subdivision has seven blocks: Akbarpur, Govindpur, Meskaur, Narhat, Rajauli, Roh, Siradala.

Politics 
In the 2020 Bihar Legislative Assembly election in Rajauli Assembly constituency, RJD won. Prakash Veer is the sitting Member of the Legislative Assembly (MLA) from the Rajauli Assembly constituency.

Public amenities

Health 
Rajauli has a Primary Health Centre (PHC) as well as a 75-bed Sub-Divisional Hospital (SDH). In 2021 the sub-divisional hospital had posts for 33 doctors out of which 5 general doctors and numerous nursing staff are deputed. There is no provision of a female doctor, and other basic facilities were lacking.

Transport 
The nearest airport is Gaya Airport, 72 km distant. The nearest railway station is at Dilwa, 19 km away. A limited number of passenger trains stop there. The bigger stations are Koderma (32 km away) and Gaya Junction (70 km away). Rajauli is on NH20 (old NH 31) and well-connected by bus services. Buses on their way to and from Patna, Gaya and Ranchi stop at Rajauli or at Chhapra for food. For most buses travelling between Patna and Ranchi, Rajauli is a meal stop. Local people come to Rajauli using their bicycles, jugaads, cars or tractors.

Education
In 2017, Rajauli block had 143 schools. 

The Rajauli Inter School located at block headquarters lacked computer facilities in May 2022, accordingly computer related subjects are not taught. Inspections have revealed basic shortcomings in the situation of some schools located in more rural areas of the block. 

In 2022, Project Kanya Inter School, Rajauli, produced a state topper in the Bihar School Examination Board exams in which over 16 lakh candidates participated.
Maa Mathurasini Mahavidyalaya
Rajauli Inter Vidyalaya
Project Kanya Uccha Vidhyalala
Rajkiye Kanya Madhya Vidhyalaya
Rajkiye Uccha Vidhyalaya
Saptrashi Degree College
Saraswati Shishu/vidya Mandir
Dayanand Anglo vidyalaya (DAV)
St Joseph school
South city international public school
Brilliant Public School
Tara Memorial Residential school
Rajeev Gandhi computer Saksharta mission

Economy
Nuclear Power Corporation of India has identified Rajauli as a prospective location for creating a 2,000-mW nuclear power plant. There are plans to set up a 28MW hydro power plant in Rajauli, which will help Bihar become energy independent. Water will be provided from Phulwaria dam reservoir.

Agriculture
Rajauli has clay loam soil. The accumulation of rain or flood water over a considerable part of the district makes the land fit for paddy cultivation. Principal crops are paddy, wheat, gram, maze, arhar, khesari, peas, sugarcane, potatoes, chillies and mung. Aghani or winter rice is usually cultivated in the lowlands.

Business
Nearly half the population of Rajauli is engaged in small- and medium-sized businesses. Balushahi is one of the popular takeaways from this place. One of the major businesses in Rajauli is the marketing of agricultural produce. Local merchants sell cloth, kirana, manihari, medicines, and local furniture. Major brands including HERO, Honda, Duke, Mahindra, Bajaj, Uninor, Idea, and Airtel have authorized dealers in Rajauli. The weekly Friday Hat at Bajrangbali Chowk is popular.  A few mills, including the rice mill Navdurga Agrotech Pvt., processes raw and export to other states.

Places of worship 
Temples include the Bajrangbali temple, Devi Mandap, Shivalaya, Manokamna Dham, Bajrangbali, Kali Mandir and other temples.

Gallery

Notable people 

 Ganesh Shankar Vidyarthi (politician)

See also 

 Tekari Raj

Notelist

References

Bibliography

Further reading

External links 

 Dhanarjay Reservoir Scheme and link to Phulwaria Reservoir Scheme. Intralinking of Rivers.
PTI (23 December 2017). Guru Circuit will be developed in Bihar, says CM Nitish Kumar. The Indian Express.
Mausam Kumari: demanding adolescent health services. Population Foundation of India
Ground Water Information Booklet Nawada District, Bihar State. 2013.
The Journal of the Administrative Sciences, Volume 15

Cities and towns in Nawada district